Holy Cross National Forest was established as the Holy Cross Forest Reserve by the U.S. Forest Service in Colorado on August 25, 1905 with .  It became a National Forest on March 4, 1907. On August 7, 1920 Sopris National Forest was absorbed. On January 1, 1945 the entire forest was transferred to White River National Forest and the name was discontinued.

References

External links
Forest History Society
Forest History Society:Listing of the National Forests of the United States Text from Davis, Richard C., ed. Encyclopedia of American Forest and Conservation History. New York: Macmillan Publishing Company for the Forest History Society, 1983. Vol. II, pp. 743-788.

Former National Forests of Colorado